Sagara Deepa is a 1994 Kannada-language action drama film directed by T. S. Nagabharana who also wrote the screenplay for a novel by former Chief Minister of Karnataka, M. Veerappa Moily.

The film stars Raghavendra Rajkumar in the role of Kumar, a young man who disturbed by the plight of fishermen sets out to free them from exploitation by a middleman Bantappa played by Vajramuni. Sripriya, Sribharati, Srinath, M. S. Umesh and Honnavalli Krishna played other key roles.

The film was produced by Suresh Kumar under S. P. R. Combines. The film has musical score by Upendra Kumar.

Cast 

 Raghavendra Rajkumar
 Vajramuni
 Supriya
 Sribharati
 Srinath
 M. S. Umesh
 Honnavalli Krishna
 Balaraj

References

External links 

1994 films
Indian action drama films
1990s action drama films
Films directed by T. S. Nagabharana